Caledonia is a community located on the Grand River in Haldimand County, Ontario, Canada. It had a population of 9,674 as of the 2016 Canadian Census. Caledonia is within Ward 3 of Haldimand County. The Councillor elected for Ward 3 is Dan Lawrence. As of September 2006, there were approximately 4,000 households in the community of Caledonia.

Caledonia is located at the intersection of Highway 6 and Haldimand Highway 54 (within the town, these streets are called Argyle Street and Caithness Street respectively) on the Grand River.

History

Caledonia was once a small strip of land between Seneca and Oneida villages. The Grand River passed through Caledonia dividing it into two sides, North and South. In 1834, Ranald McKinnon was hired by the Grand River Navigation company to build a dam in Seneca and a dam in Caledonia. Completed in 1840, the dams made water power available. Mills sprung up all over Seneca village, and five mills were built in Caledonia by 1850. One renamed Caledonia Mill which has been rebuilt and is now used for office space.

The Hamilton to Port Dover plank road was brought through Caledonia in 1838. A bridge was built across the river in Caledonia and Seneca in 1842. These wooden bridges lasted around 19 years before they were swept away by the ice on the river. The Seneca bridge was never rebuilt. As of 2011, the Grand River Bridge built in 1927 serves Caledonia's traffic.

In 1844, Caledonia was incorporated as a village and later as a town. By 1860, the Grand River Navigation company was bankrupt, and their land was sold to different organizations. Seneca village was failing; many people from Seneca moved to Caledonia. Navigation on the river ended by 1880. A whole new way of transportation arrived around 1883; the Grand Trunk Railway passed through Caledonia. Oneida had become part of Caledonia and the town limits were expanding. By 1960 Caledonia was a bustling town.

On April 1, 1974, the town was amalgamated into the new town of Haldimand within the Regional Municipality of Haldimand-Norfolk. Although the largest community in Haldimand, the town hall was located in nearby Cayuga. In 2001, Haldimand and all other municipalities within the region were dissolved and the region was instead divided into two single tier municipalities with city-status but called counties. Caledonia is now an unincorporated community in Ward 3 of Haldimand County.

In 2006, the Grand River land dispute involving First Nation land claims brought Caledonia to national attention.  The land at the centre of the dispute in Caledonia covers 40 hectares, which Henco Industries Ltd. planned to develop as a residential subdivision to be known as the Douglas Creek Estates.  It is part of the 385,000-hectare plot of land originally known as the "Haldimand Tract", which was granted, in 1784, by the Crown to the Six Nations of the Grand River, for their use in settlement.  Henco argues that the Six Nations surrendered their rights to the land in 1841, and Henco later purchased it from the Crown. The Six Nations, however, maintain that their title to the land was never relinquished.

Caledonia Mill
Caledonia Old Town Hall (Edinburgh Square)
Grand River Bridge
Grand River Dam
Grand Trunk Railway Station
Haldimand House
Oasis Drive-In
Caledonia Opera House

Toll House
The Caledonia Toll House is the second oldest building in Caledonia, Ontario still standing; the first being Haldimand House. The toll house is currently a private residence.

The toll house was there when the original iron bridge collapsed and the new concrete one (still used today) was built.

With the historic Caledonia Bridge in need of complete replacement, the beautiful historic toll house which is currently a home and business has been expropriated as part of the Ministry of Transportations plan to replace.

Sports
Hockey Team: Caledonia Corvairs

Schools
Caledonia Centennial Public School
Notre Dame Catholic School
River Heights
St. Patrick's Catholic School
Oneida Central Public School
McKinnon Park Secondary School

Notable people
Andrew Campbell, NHL player
Roy Edwards, (1937–1999), former NHL player
Jack Hamilton (1886–1976), ice hockey and multi-sport executive
Isaac Kragten, actor
Cam Talbot, NHL player
Byron Edmund Walker, (1848–1924), banker and patron of the arts

References

Communities in Haldimand County
Populated places on the Grand River (Ontario)